Asier Salcedo Borrega (born 9 April 1980 in Vitoria-Gasteiz, Álava) is a Spanish retired footballer who played as a midfielder.

External links

1980 births
Living people
Footballers from Vitoria-Gasteiz
Spanish footballers
Association football midfielders
La Liga players
Segunda División players
Segunda División B players
Tercera División players
Deportivo Alavés B players
Deportivo Alavés players
Alicante CF footballers
Pontevedra CF footballers
SD Ponferradina players
Logroñés CF footballers
Real Unión footballers
Club Portugalete players